Carne asada is grilled and sliced beef, usually chuck steak (known as Diezmillo in Spanish), though skirt steak, flap steak, or flank steak can also be used. It is usually marinated then grilled or seared to impart a charred flavor. Carne asada can be served on its own or as an ingredient in other dishes.

Despite it being a grilled dish, the term carne asada translates literally to "roast meat"; the English-style dish "roast beef" is called rosbif in Spanish, so that each dish has a distinctive name. The term carne asada is used in Mexico and refers to the style of grilled meat in those countries. In South America, the term used for grilled meat is asado and it has a different style and preparation.

Preparation
Carne asada can be purchased from meat markets either prepared (preparada, i.e., already marinated) or not (no preparada), for marinating at home. The meat is characteristically marinated in lime juice, salt, and Mexican seasonings, but may also be simply rubbed with salt or spice rubs such as lemon pepper, before grilled. After grilling it is typically chopped for filling tacos and burritos, which also minimizes toughness.

As an ingredient
Carne asada can be served as a main dish, but it is also commonly chopped up and used as an ingredient in other dishes. These popular dishes use carne asada as a main ingredient:

 Alambres
 Burritos
 Carne asada friesGorditas
 Guaraches
 Nachos
 Quesadillas
 Sopes
 Tacos
 TortasAs an event
In 
Mexico and other countries in Central America, the phrase carne asada can also be used to describe a social event, the equivalent of a social barbecue, where family and close friends gather.Carne Asada – This Latin American Tradition is Much More Than Just a Meal
Carne asada is especially popular in northern Mexico, where it is considered a staple food. It is the most common dish served at parties, celebrations, and other events in northern Mexico.

Gallery 

See alsoAsadoChurrasco''

References

Barbecue
Mexican cuisine
Tex-Mex cuisine
National dishes
Beef steak dishes
Mexican beef dishes

es:Carne asada